The Deep is a 2012 Icelandic drama film directed by Baltasar Kormákur. The film was selected as the Icelandic entry for the Best Foreign Language Oscar at the 85th Academy Awards, making the January shortlist. It was also nominated for the 2013 Nordic Council Film Prize. The film is based on the true story of Guðlaugur Friðþórsson, a fisherman who survived in the freezing ocean after his boat capsized off the south coast of Iceland.

Cast
Ólafur Darri Ólafsson as Gulli
Jóhann G. Jóhannsson as Palli
Þorbjörg Helga Þorgilsdóttir as Halla
Theódór Júlíusson as Gulli's Father
María Sigurðardóttir as Gulli's Mother
Björn Thors as Hannes
Þröstur Leó Gunnarsson as Lárus
Guðjón Pedersen as Erlingur
Walter Grímsson as Raggi
Stefán Hallur Stefánsson as Jón

Reception
On review aggregator website Rotten Tomatoes, the film holds a 94% approval rating, based on 31 reviews with an average rating of 6.6/10.
Peter Bradshaw of The Guardian wrote "The mystery of an Icelandic man who survived icy seas for six hours makes for an intriguing drama".

See also
List of submissions to the 85th Academy Awards for Best Foreign Language Film
List of Icelandic submissions for the Academy Award for Best Foreign Language Film
Survival film, with a list of related films

References

External links

2012 drama films
2010s survival films
2012 action drama films
Drama films based on actual events
Films directed by Baltasar Kormákur
Films set in 1984
Films set in Iceland
Sea adventure films
Icelandic action drama films